Ebenezer, Ontario can refer to the following places:

Ebenezer, Brampton
Ebenezer, Hastings County, Ontario
Ebenezer, Leeds and Grenville County, Ontario
Ebenezer, Simcoe County, Ontario